The  was a series of equipment failures, nuclear meltdowns, and releases of radioactive materials at the Fukushima I Nuclear Power Plant, following the Tōhoku earthquake and tsunami on 11 March 2011. It is the largest nuclear disaster since the Chernobyl disaster of 1986.

The plant comprises six separate boiling water reactors originally designed by General Electric (GE), and maintained by the Tokyo Electric Power Company (TEPCO). At the time of the quake, Reactor 4 had been de-fueled while 5 and 6 were in cold shutdown for planned maintenance. Immediately after the earthquake, the remaining reactors 1-3 shut down automatically, and emergency generators came online to control electronics and coolant systems. However, the tsunami following the earthquake quickly flooded the low-lying rooms in which the emergency generators were housed. The flooded generators failed, cutting power to the critical pumps that must continuously circulate coolant water through the reactor core. With the pumps stopped, the reactor cores began to overheat.

At this point, only prompt flooding of the reactors with seawater could have cooled the reactors quickly enough to prevent meltdown. Salt water flooding was delayed because it would ruin the costly reactors permanently. Flooding with seawater was finally commenced only after the government ordered that seawater be used, and at this point it was already too late to prevent meltdown.

As the water boiled away in the reactors and the water levels in the fuel rod pools dropped, the reactor fuel rods began to overheat severely, and to melt down. In the hours and days that followed, Reactors 1, 2 and 3 experienced full meltdown.

In the intense heat and pressure of the melting reactors, a reaction between the nuclear fuel metal cladding and the remaining water surrounding them produced explosive hydrogen gas. As workers struggled to cool and shut down the reactors, several hydrogen explosions occurred.

Concerns about the repeated small explosions, the atmospheric venting of radioactive gasses, and the possibility of larger explosions led to a -radius evacuation around the plant. During the early days of the accident workers were temporarily evacuated at various times for radiation safety reasons. At the same time, sea water that had been exposed to the melting rods was returned to the sea heated and radioactive in large volumes for several months until recirculating units could be put in place to repeatedly cool and re-use a limited quantity of water for cooling. The earthquake damage and flooding in the wake of the tsunami hindered external assistance. Electrical power was slowly restored for some of the reactors, allowing for automated cooling.

Japanese officials initially assessed the accident as Level 4 on the International Nuclear Event Scale (INES) despite the views of other international agencies that it should be higher. The level was later raised to 5 and eventually to 7, the maximum scale value. The Japanese government and TEPCO have been criticized in the foreign press for poor communication with the public and improvised cleanup efforts. On 20 March, the Chief Cabinet Secretary Yukio Edano announced that the plant would be decommissioned once the crisis was over.

The Japanese government estimates the total amount of radioactivity released into the atmosphere was approximately one-tenth as much as was released during the Chernobyl disaster. Significant amounts of radioactive material have also been released into ground and ocean waters. Measurements taken by the Japanese government 30–50 km from the plant showed caesium-137 levels high enough to cause concern, leading the government to ban the sale of food grown in the area. Tokyo officials temporarily recommended that tap water should not be used to prepare food for infants. In May 2012, TEPCO reported that at least 900 PBq had been released "into the atmosphere in March last year [2011] alone" although it has been said staff may have been told to lie, and give false readings to try and cover up true levels of radiation.

A few of the plant's workers were severely injured or killed by the disaster conditions resulting from the earthquake. There were no immediate deaths due to direct radiation exposures, but at least six workers have exceeded lifetime legal limits for radiation and more than 300 have received significant radiation doses. Predicted future cancer deaths due to accumulated radiation exposures in the population living near Fukushima have ranged from none to 100 to a non-peer-reviewed "guesstimate" of 1,000. On 16 December 2011, Japanese authorities declared the plant to be stable, although it would take decades to decontaminate the surrounding areas and to decommission the plant altogether. On 5 July 2012, the parliament appointed The Fukushima Nuclear Accident Independent Investigation Commission (NAIIC) submitted its inquiry report to the Japanese parliament, while the government appointed Investigation Committee on the Accident at the Fukushima Nuclear Power Stations of Tokyo Electric Power Company submitted its final report to the Japanese government on 23 July 2012. Tepco admitted for the first time on 12 October 2012 that it had failed to take stronger measures to prevent disasters for fear of inviting lawsuits or protests against its nuclear plants.

Unit 1 Reactor

Details of the core

F. Tanabe has estimated that the core contained the following materials:
 Uranium dioxide 78.3 tons
 Zirconium 32.7 tons
 Steel 12.5 tons
 Boron carbide 590 kilograms
 Inconel 1 ton

Cooling problems and first radioactivity release

On 11 March at 14:46 JST, in response to the earthquake, TEPCO successfully scrammed the reactor in Unit 1, shutting down all power-producing nuclear fission chain reactions. Evacuated workers reported violent shaking and burst pipes within the reactor building. At 15:37, the quake's tsunami inundated the plant and all electrical power to the facility was lost, leaving only emergency batteries. Some of the monitoring and control systems were still operational, though Unit 1's batteries had been damaged by the flood waters. At 15:42, TEPCO declared a "Nuclear Emergency Situation" for Units 1 and 2 because "reactor water coolant injection could not be confirmed for the emergency core cooling systems." The alert was temporarily cleared when water level monitoring was restored for Unit 1 but it was reinstated at 17:07 JST. Potentially radioactive steam was released from the primary circuit into the secondary containment area to reduce mounting pressure in the core.

To cool the reactor, operators resorted to the plant's Emergency core-cooling systems (ECCS), including the isolation condensers, and the High Pressure Coolant Injection systems (HPCI). According to NHK, the isolation condenser system had not been activated in the previous 40 years, and no one present had ever witnessed its operation. It was also later discovered that TEPCO had made changes to the system's original design, without approval or notification of NISA. During the crisis, operators couldn't tell if one of the system's valves was open or closed.

About 10 minutes after the earthquake, TEPCO operators removed both of Unit 1's isolation condensers from service, and instead activated the HPCI system. At 15:07, the core spray system was activated to cool the suppression pool. Both systems lost power after the tsunami struck the plant. The tsunami's arrival prevented operators from restarting the isolation condensers for more than 30 minutes. Afterwards, they were operated intermittently. Despite being designed to cool Unit 1 for at least 8 hours, the condensers' limited operation did not reduce the heat in the core and containment vessel.

By midnight, water levels in the reactor were falling and TEPCO gave warnings of the possibility of radioactive releases. In the early hours of 12 March, TEPCO reported that radiation levels were rising in the turbine building for Unit 1. Operators were considering venting some of the mounting pressure into the atmosphere, which could result in the release of some radioactivity. Later that morning, Chief Cabinet Secretary Yukio Edano stated that the amount of potential radiation would be small and that the prevailing winds were blowing out to sea. Pressure inside Unit 1 continued to rise. At 05:30 JST, it had reached 820 kPa, 2.1 times normal. After isolation cooling had ceased to operate, TEPCO started relieving pressure and injecting water. One employee working inside Unit 1 at this time received a radiation dose of 106 mSv and was later sent to a hospital to have his condition assessed.

Without electricity, needed for water pumps and ventilation fans, rising heat within the containment area led to increasing pressure. In a press release on 12 March at 07:00 JST, TEPCO stated, "Measurement of radioactive material (iodine-131, etc.) by monitoring car indicates increasing value compared to normal level. One of the monitoring posts is also indicating higher than normal level." Dose rates recorded on the main gate rose from 69 n Gy/h (for gamma radiation, equivalent to 69 nSv/h) at 04:00 JST, 12 March, to 866 nGy/h 40 minutes later, before hitting a peak of 0.3855 mSv/h at 10:30 JST. At 13:30 JST, workers detected radioactive caesium-137 and iodine-131 near Reactor 1, a sign that water levels in the coolant system had dropped so low that some of the core's fuel had melted, after being exposed to the air. Cooling water levels had fallen so much that parts of the nuclear fuel rods were exposed and partial melting might have occurred. Radiation levels at the site boundary exceeded the regulatory limits.

On 14 March, radiation levels had continued to increase on the premises, measuring at 02:20 an intensity of 0.751 mSv/h on one location and at 02:40 an intensity of 0.650 mSv/h at another location on the premises. On 16 March, the maximum readings peaked at 10.850 mSv/h.

Hydrogen explosion
At 07:00 JST on 12 March, Prime Minister Naoto Kan asked Daiichi director Masao Yoshida why his workers were not opening the valves to release rising steam pressure within the reactor. Yoshida answered that they could not open the electrical valves because of the power failure and the radiation was too high to send workers to manually open the valves. Nevertheless, with the pressure and temperatures continuing to rise, at 09:15, TEPCO sent workers to begin manually opening the valves. The high radiation slowed the work and the valves were not opened until 14:30.

At 15:36 JST on 12 March, there was an explosion in the reactor building at Unit 1. The side walls of the upper level were blown away, leaving in place only the vertical steel framed gridworks. The roof collapsed, covering the floor and some machinery on the south side. The walls were relatively intact compared to later explosions at Units 3 and 4. Video of the explosion shows that it was primarily directed sideways.

The roof of the building was designed to provide ordinary weather protection for the areas inside, not to withstand the high pressure of an explosion. In the Fukushima I reactors the primary containment consists of "drywell" and "wetwell" concrete structures below the top level, immediately surrounding the reactor pressure vessel. The secondary containment includes the top floor with water-filled pools for storing fresh or irradiated fuel and for storage of irradiated tools and structures.

Experts soon agreed that the cause was a hydrogen explosion. Almost certainly the hydrogen was formed inside the reactor vessel because of falling water levels exposing zircaloy structures/fuel assembly cladding, which then reacted with steam and produced hydrogen, with the hydrogen subsequently vented into the containment building. When the hydrogen reached ignition concentration in the air of the secondary containment building, an ignition source such as a spark triggered a hydrogen-oxygen explosion, blowing out the walls of this building from the inside.

Officials indicated that reactor primary containment had remained intact and that there had been no large leaks of radioactive material, although an increase in radiation levels was confirmed following the explosion. The report of the fact-finding commission states that "There is a possibility that the bottom of the RPV [reactor pressure vessel] was damaged and some of the fuel might have dropped and accumulated on the D/W [dry well] floor (lower pedestal)." The Fukushima prefectural government reported radiation dose rates at the plant reaching 1.015 m Sv/h. The IAEA stated on 13 March that four workers had been injured by the explosion at the Unit 1 reactor, and that three injuries were reported in other incidents at the site. They also reported one worker was exposed to higher-than-normal radiation levels but the level fell below their guidance for emergency situations.

Seawater used for cooling
At 20:05 JST on 12 March, the Japanese government ordered seawater to be injected into Unit 1 in a new effort to cool the reactor core. The treatment had been held as a last resort since it ruins the reactor. TEPCO started seawater cooling at 20:20, adding boric acid as a neutron absorber to prevent a criticality accident. The water would take five to ten hours to fill the reactor core, after which the reactor would cool down in around ten days. The injection of seawater into the reactor pressure vessel was done by fire department trucks. At 01:10 JST on 14 March, injection of seawater was halted for two hours because all available water in the plant pools had run out (similarly, feed to Unit 3 was halted). NISA news reports stated 70% of the fuel rods had been damaged when uncovered.

On 12 March, a new electrical distribution panel was installed in an office adjacent to Unit 1 to supply power via Unit 2 when it was reconnected to the transmission grid two days later. On 21 March, injection of seawater continued, as did repairs to the control instrumentation. On 23 March, it became possible to inject water into the reactor using the feed water system rather than the fire trucks, raising the flow rate from 2 to 18 m3/h (later reduced to 11m3/h, and even further to reduce the build up of contaminated water); on 24 March, electricity was restored to the central operating room.

As of 24 March, the spent fuel pool was "thought to be fully or partially exposed", according to CNN. Pressure in the reactor had increased owing to the seawater injection, resulting in steam being vented, later alleviated by reducing the water flow. Temperature increases were also reportedly temporary. TEPCO condensed some of the steam to water in the spent fuel pool.

It was estimated that as much as 26 tonnes of sea salt may have accumulated in reactor Unit 1 and twice that amount in Units 2 and 3. As salt clogs cooling pipes and erodes zirconium oxide layer of the fuel rods, switching to the use of freshwater for cooling was a high priority.

The use of seawater has the potential to make uranium chemistry more complex; in pure water the hydrogen peroxide formed by the radiolysis of water can react with uranium dioxide to form a solid peroxide mineral known as studtite. According to Navrotsky et al. this mineral has been found in the fuel storage pond at the plutonium production site at Hanford. Navrotsky et al. report that when alkali metal ions are present, uranium can form nanoparticles (U60 clusters) which may be more mobile than the solid studtite. A review of the research done at the University of Notre Dame on the subject of nanoscale actinyl clusters was published in 2010.

Reactor stabilization

By 24 March, electrical power (initially from temporary sources, but off-site power used from 3 April) was being restored to parts of the unit, with the Main Control Room lighting being restored.

On 25 March, fresh water became available again to be added to the reactor instead of salt water, while work continued to repair the unit's cooling systems. A volume of 1890 m3 (500,000 USgal) of fresh water was brought to the plant by a barge provided by the US Navy. On 29 March, the fire trucks which had been used to inject water into the reactor were replaced by electrical pumps.

On 28 March, pumping began to remove water contaminated with radioactive 137Cs and 131I from basement areas, storing it in the condenser system. By 29 March, pumping was halted because condensate reservoirs were almost full and plans were being considered to transfer water to the suppression pool surge tanks.

On 7 April, TEPCO began injecting nitrogen into the containment vessel, which was expected to reduce the likelihood of further hydrogen explosions. The injection has been ongoing since then and has been repeated on the other units at Fukushima. On 7 April, before a large aftershock, temperatures in the reactor core unexpectedly "surged in temperature to 260 °C"; the cause was unknown, but the temperature dropped to 246 °C by 8 April. On 27 April, TEPCO revised its estimate of damaged fuel in Unit 1 from 55% to 70%.

On 17 April, remote control robot was used to enter the Reactor Building and performed a series of inspections, which confirmed on 29 April that there was no significant water leakage coming from the containment vessel.

On 23 and 26 April, concerns that Unit 1 fuel rods may be exposed to air caused TEPCO to consider filling the "containment vessel with water to cool the reactor" despite concerns for building integrity. Efforts were slowed by Unit 1 radiation measurements "as high as 1,120 millisierverts of radiation per hour". On 13 May, TEPCO announced it would proceed with a plan to fill the containment vessel despite the possibility of holes caused by melting fuel elements in the pressure vessel. TEPCO had expected to increase the amount of water pumped to Unit 1 to compensate for any leakage from the holes but decided on 15 May to abandon the plan after finding the Unit 1 basement was already half flooded.

On 5 May, ventilation systems were installed in the Reactor Building, to clean the highly radioactive air encapsulated in it.

On 12 May, the water level gauge for the reactor was calibrated, and it was subsequently identified that the water level was lower than previously thought (as the water level went off the lower side of the gauge).

On 13 May, preparatory work started on the installation of the Reactor Building covers. Construction work started on 28 June.

On 20 May, staff entered the Reactor Building, confirming reactor water level and radioactivity.

Since 2 July, the reactor has been cooled using fresh water from the on-site water treatment plant.

On 21 August, TEPCO reported that all of the temperature sensors of Unit 1 were recording temperatures less than 100 degrees Celsius on Friday 19 August. Once other goals are met, Unit 1 will have achieved cold shutdown state.

On 28 October, TEPCO reported the completion of cover construction at reactor building of Unit 1 of Fukushima Daiichi nuclear power station.

On 19 January 2012, the interior of the primary containment vessel of reactor 2 was inspected by TEPCO for the first time after the accident, with an industrial endoscope. With this device photos were taken and the temperature was measured at this spot and from the cooling-water inside, in an attempt to calibrate the existing temperature-measurements that could have an error margin of 20 °C (36 °F). The procedure lasted 70 minutes. The photos showed parts of the walls and pipes inside the containment vessel, but they were unclear and blurred, most likely due to water vapors and the radiation inside. According to TEPCO the photos showed no serious damage.

Possibility of criticality
Reports of 13 observations of neutron beams 1.5 km "southwest of the plant's No. 1 and 2 reactors" from 13 to 16 March raised the possibility that nuclear chain reactions could have occurred after the initial SCRAMing of the reactors at Fukushima Daiichi. 16 March reports that fuel rods in the spent fuel pool at Unit 4 could have been exposed to air appeared to indicate that uncontrolled fission may have occurred in that fuel pool. Later reports of exceptionally high iodine-134 levels appeared to confirm this theory because very high levels of iodine-134 would be indicative of criticality. The same report also showed high measurements of chlorine-38, which some nuclear experts used to calculate that self-propagating fission must be occurring in Unit 1. Despite TEPCO suggesting the iodine-134 report was inaccurate, the IAEA appeared to accept the chlorine-based analysis as a valid theory suggesting criticality when it stated at a press conference that "melted fuel in the No. 1 reactor building may be causing isolated, uncontrolled nuclear chain reactions". TEPCO confirmed its concern about the accuracy of the high iodine and chlorine report by formally retracting the report on 21 April, which eliminated both the exceptionally high iodine-134 and chlorine-38 levels as proof of criticality. TEPCO did not appear to comment on the criticality concern when withdrawing its report, but the IAEA has not withdrawn its comments, and some off-site experts find the currently measured iodine-134 levels higher than expected.

Meltdown
On 12 May, TEPCO engineers confirmed that a meltdown occurred, with molten fuel having fallen to the bottom of the reactor's pressure vessel, or RPV. The utility said that fuel rods of the No. 1 reactor are fully exposed, with the water level 1 meter (3.3 feet) below the base of the fuel assembly. According to a Japanese press report, there are holes in the base of the pressure vessel – these holes were meant for the control-rods. After the fuel had melted, it produced holes in the bottom of the RPV, and then escaped into the containment vessel. In November 2011 TEPCO did not know the shape or porosity of the fuel mass, which is at the bottom of the containment vessel. As a result, it is impossible to know exactly how far the fuel mass would have eroded the concrete floor, but TEPCO estimate that no more than 70 cm of a 7.6 meter concrete slab was eroded away by the hot fuel. The production of heat and steam in unit 1 has decreased, as suggested by both radioactive decay calculations and photographic evidence (same source from TEPCO).

TEPCO estimates the nuclear fuel was exposed to the air less than five hours after the earthquake struck. Fuel rods melted away rapidly as the temperature inside the core reached 2,800 °C within six hours. In less than 16 hours, the reactor core melted and dropped to the bottom of the pressure vessel, burning a hole through the vessel. By that time, water was pumped into the reactor in an effort to prevent the worst-case scenario – overheating fuel melting its way through the containment and discharging large amounts of radionuclides in the environment. In June the Japanese government confirmed that Unit 1 reactor vessel containment was breached, and pumped cooling water continues to leak months after the disaster.

On 11 October 2012, TEPCO released results of the first direct inspections (by remotely operated camera) of conditions in the interior of the Reactor 1 PCV. These suggest that the initial assumptions concerning the behaviour of the fuel mass during the accident may have been incorrect. In particular, the distribution of radiation levels within the PCV, with peak levels being around the bottom head of the RPV, suggest that the majority of the fuel has in fact been retained within the RPV. Radiation levels are also notably lower around the lower parts of the "Drywell", suggesting that fuel had not reached the bottom of the containment vessel, or damaged the concrete floor slab. There is a further issue in that radiation levels within the water inside the containment are markedly higher than those in the reactor basements, suggesting that either there is limited flow from the PCV to the basement, or that substantial dilution is taking place - raising the issue of what is the flow path for the water.

Spent fuel pool of reactor 1
From 31 March, additional sea water was added to the spent fuel pool, initially by using a concrete pump. Fresh water was used from 14 May. By 29 May water was able to be injected using a temporary pump and the Spent Fuel Pool Cooling (FPC) line.

On 10 August, the spent fuel pool was switched from the water-injection system – that functioned some 5 months – to a circulatory cooling system. For the first time since the 11 March disaster, all four damaged reactors at the plant were using circulatory cooling systems with heat-exchangers.

See also
 List of civilian nuclear accidents
 Lists of nuclear disasters and radioactive incidents
 Timeline of the Fukushima Daiichi nuclear disaster
 Comparison of Fukushima and Chernobyl nuclear accidents

References

External links
 The Fukushima Nuclear Accident Independent Investigation Commission Report website in English
 Executive summary of the Fukushima Nuclear Accident Independent Investigation Commission Report
 Fukushima report: Key points in nuclear disaster report - An outline of key quotes, findings and recommendations from the 88-page executive summary of the Nuclear Accident Independent Investigation Commission's report, as provided by the BBC, 5 July 2012
 Webcam Fukushima nuclear power plant I, Unit 1 through Unit 4
 Investigation Committee on the accidents at the Fukushima Nuclear Power Station of Tokyo Electric Power Company
 Schematic drawing of Unit 1 reactor building
 TEPCO News Releases, Tokyo Electric Power Company
 NISA Information update, Nuclear and Industrial Safety Agency, the nuclear safety authority of Japan
 JAIF Information update, Japan Atomic International Forum
 JAEA Information update, Japan Atomic Energy Agency
 IAEA Update on Japan Earthquake, International Atomic Energy Agency
 Nature Journal – Specials: Japan earthquake and nuclear crisis
 TerraFly Timeline Aerial Imagery of Fukushima Nuclear Reactor after 2011 Tsunami and Earthquake
 Documentary photographs: residential damage within "No Go" Zone
 In graphics: Fukushima nuclear alert, as provided by the BBC, 9 July 2012
 PreventionWeb Japan: 2011 Fukushima Daiichi nuclear disaster  
 "What should we learn from the severe accident at the Fukushima Dai-ichi Nuclear Power Plant?" by Kenichi Ohmae, Team H2O Project. 28 October 2011

Fukushima Daiichi nuclear disaster